Ralph Kim Drollinger (born April 20, 1954) is an American clergyman and retired professional basketball player, and leader of the "White House Bible Study Group," a study group sponsored by 10 cabinet members which held weekly meetings each Wednesday during the Trump administration.

Education
Drollinger attended Grossmont High School in La Mesa and the University of California, Los Angeles, where he received a Bachelor of Arts degree in Geography/Ecosystems. He later received a Masters of Divinity degree from The Master's Seminary.

Basketball
Drollinger played basketball at Grossmont High School and was the CIF Southern Section MVP, as his team won the 1972 CIF championship as a high school All-American. He was a 7'2" (2.19 m) and 250 lb (114 kg) center and played collegiately at the University of California, Los Angeles (UCLA).  He was the first player in NCAA history to go to four Final Four tournaments. He played for two national championship teams under coach John Wooden and after his first season, won the Seymour Armond Award as UCLA's most outstanding freshman. In his junior and senior years he was an Academic All-American. 

Drollinger also played on America' World Cup Basketball team in 1978.

Drollinger was taken in the NBA Draft three times. He chose to forgo the NBA during those years to instead play with Athletes in Action, an evangelistic basketball team that toured the world and preached the gospel at halftimes and represented America in the 1978 FIBA World Championship. He was selected with the 17th pick in the seventh round in 1976 by the Boston Celtics, with the 1st pick of the eighth round in 1977 by the New York Nets, and finally with the 17th pick of the fifth round in 1978 by the Seattle SuperSonics.

Drollinger was the first Dallas Maverick ever in the history of the then new NBA franchise.

He signed with the Dallas Mavericks in June 1980 as a free agent before they had hired Dick Motta as the head coach, motivated by his desire to attend Dallas Theological Seminary during his playing days. He played in only six games due to a knee injury which led to his retirement from basketball in March 1981. In the Mavs' inaugural season in 1980–81, he averaged 2.5 points, 3.2 rebounds and 2.3 assists per game.

Some years later after his retirement, Dr. James Dobson invited Drollinger to play in an early morning pick up game with Pete Maravich. That morning Maravich collapsed in the middle of the game from a massive heart attack. Dobson and Drollinger administered CPR, but to no avail; Maravich was pronounced dead upon arrival at the hospital.

He was selected as one of the Fabulous 50 Basketball Players by the San Diego Hall of Champions in 2011.

Sports ministry
After his brief injury-plagued professional career, Drollinger founded and participated in a variety of sports related ministries.  He helped found and was the Executive Director of Sports Outreach America, an umbrella trade organization of American church and parachurch sports ministries, such as the Fellowship of Christian Athletes, Athletes in Action, and Pro Athletes Outreach.  He founded Sports Spectrum Magazine, a bi-monthly print magazine that features the testimony of Christian athletes, the "Path To Victory" Sports New Testament in conjunction with Biblica, He also founded, produced and financed Julius Erving's Sports Focus, a weekly one-half hour television anthology on ESPN featuring the testimony of Christian athletes and hosted by NBA player Julius Erving.

Capitol ministries 
In 1997, Drollinger founded Capitol Ministries, a ministry organization that provides Bible studies, evangelism and discipleship to political leaders. The organization has founded ministries in over 40 US State Capitols since then. Drollinger leads Capitol Ministries in Washington, D.C. and what is referred to internally as The Members Bible Study in the US Capitol. Drollinger also leads several senior Trump administration officials in a similar group at the White House, and provides bible study print-outs for Donald Trump. He is not associated with The Fellowship due to what he perceives as their unbiblical teaching.

Political philosophy 
Drollinger is a conservative evangelical Christian who describes his belief that there should indeed be an "institutional" separation of Church and State, but that the Church should still "influence" the State.  Drollinger is also on record as being anti-LGBTQ, anti-women's rights, anti-immigration (he supports family separation at the border), a climate change denier, and declaring Catholicism as "one of the primary false religions of the world." In March 2020, Drollinger generated controversy when he appeared to link the COVID-19 pandemic with God's wrath and homosexuality. He later stated that he was misinterpreted and that he did not "believe that homosexuality played any role whatsoever in the coronavirus."

Publications
Rebuilding America: The Biblical Blueprint

Personal life
Drollinger is married to Danielle Madison, the founding and former executive director of California's Allied Business PAC, with whom he shares three children and seven grandchildren. He is also the son of the founder of Adventure16, a retail chain of mountaineering specialty stores located throughout Southern California. Drollinger is a world-class mountaineer and is the first person to have climbed every peak on the main ridge of the Sierra Nevada between Olancha and Sonora Pass, California, the 250 mile section of the ridge commonly referred to as the High Sierra.

See also 
 Frank Buchman
 The Fellowship (Christian organization)
 Oxford Group
 Abraham Vereide

References

Further reading 
 Schwartz, Mattathias. "How the Trump Cabinet’s Bible Teacher Became a Shadow Diplomat". The New York Times, October 29, 2019.

External links

Drollinger biography from Capitol Ministries
NBA statistics from basketballreference.com

1954 births
Living people
20th-century Protestant religious leaders
21st-century Protestant religious leaders
American Christian religious leaders
American men's basketball players
Basketball players from California
Boston Celtics draft picks
Centers (basketball)
Dallas Mavericks players
New Jersey Nets draft picks
People from La Mesa, California
Seattle SuperSonics draft picks
Sportspeople from Santa Clarita, California
Sportspeople from San Diego County, California
UCLA Bruins men's basketball players
United States men's national basketball team players
1978 FIBA World Championship players